Blackwood is a locational surname of Scottish origin meaning "black wood".  Spelling variations include: Blackwood, Blackwode, Blakewood, Blaikwood, Blacud and many more.  First found in Ayrshire, but one of the first recorded to the family name was William de Blackwood in 1327 in Stirlingshire.

Some of the first settlers of this name or some of its variants were: the Blackwoods who settled in Bonavista, Newfoundland in the early 19th century and others.

Peerage of the United Kingdom
 Basil Hamilton-Temple-Blackwood, 4th Marquess of Dufferin and Ava (1909–1945), British politician and soldier; only son of the 3rd Marquess of Dufferin and Ava
 Frederick Hamilton-Temple-Blackwood, 1st Marquess of Dufferin and Ava (1826–1902), British public servant
 Frederick Hamilton-Temple-Blackwood, 3rd Marquess of Dufferin and Ava (1875–1930), British soldier and politician; fourth son of the 1st Marquess of Dufferin and Ava
 Hariot Hamilton-Temple-Blackwood, Marchioness of Dufferin and Ava (1843–1936), British peeress who led an initiative to improve medical care for women in British India
 Sheridan Hamilton-Temple-Blackwood, 5th Marquess of Dufferin and Ava (1938–1988), British patron of the arts
 Terence Hamilton-Temple-Blackwood, 2nd Marquess of Dufferin and Ava (1866–1918), British diplomat; second son of the 1st Marquess of Dufferin and Ava

Scottish clans
 Blackwood Sept, sub-family of the Clan Douglas of Scotland.

Others
 Adam Blackwood (1539–1613), Scottish author and apologist for Mary, Queen of Scots
 Algernon Blackwood (1869–1951), British writer of ghost stories
 Beatrice Blackwood (1889-1975), British anthropologist
 Lady Caroline Blackwood (1931–1996), English writer and artist's muse; eldest child of Basil Hamilton-Temple-Blackwood, 4th Marquess of Dufferin and Ava
 J. Curtis Blackwood Jr. (born 1956), American politician
 David Lloyd Blackwood (born 1941), Canadian artist
 Easley Blackwood Jr. (1933-2023), American composer, professor of music and author; son of Easley Blackwood Sr.
 Easley Blackwood Sr. (1903–1992), American, contract bridge player and originator of the Blackwood convention; father of Easley Blackwood Jr.
 Eric Blackwood (born 1921), Canadian aviator
 Gary Blackwood (author) (born 1945), American author
 Gary Blackwood (politician), Australian politician
 Grant Blackwood, American author
 Henry Blackwood (1770–1832), British Royal Navy Vice-Admiral
 Hugh Blackwood, (born 1871), Lanark, Lanarkshire, Scotland; Municipal Health Inspector Dubbo NSW; died Oct 1942, Dubbo
 Ibra Charles Blackwood (1878–1936), American politician
 James Blackwood (1919–2002), American gospel singer with The Blackwood Brothers
 James Blackwood, 2nd Baron Dufferin and Claneboye (1755–1836), Irish politician
 Jermaine Blackwood, a Jamaican and West Indies cricketer, born 1991
 John Blackwood (disambiguation), several persons
 Kevin Blackwood, professional blackjack player, card counter and gambling author
 Mackenzie Blackwood (born 1996), Canadian ice hockey goaltender
 Margaret Blackwood (1909–1986), Australian botanist
 Michael Blackwood (disambiguation), several persons
 Nina Blackwood (born 1955),  American disc jockey and music journalist
 Richard Blackwood (born 1972), British comedian and media personality
 Vas Blackwood (born 1961), British television and film actor
 William Blackwood (1776–1834), Scottish publisher

Fictional characters
 Charlotte "Charlie" Blackwood played by Kelly McGillis in the 1986 film Top Gun
 Lord Henry Blackwood, the antagonist in the 2009 film Sherlock Holmes
 Constance Blackwood, a character in Ride the Cyclone
 Martin Blackwood, a character in The Magnus Archives
 Faustus Blackwood, a character in Chilling Adventures of Sabrina

References

Surnames of Scottish origin